Tshuapa is one of the 21 new provinces of the Democratic Republic of the Congo created in the 2015 repartitioning. Tshuapa, Équateur, Mongala, Nord-Ubangi, and Sud-Ubangi provinces are the result of the dismemberment of the former Équateur province.  Tshuapa was formed from the Tshuapa District whose town of Boende was elevated to capital city of the new province.

Location 
The province is named for the Tshuapa River. It is situated in the north-west of the country, on the Congo River.

History  
 Tshuapa was previously administered as a district as part of Équateur province.
 On 1924.02.11, the Catholic mission established the Apostolic Prefecture of Tsuapa here, on territory split off from the then Apostolic Vicariate of Nouvelle-Anvers, but it was renamed on 
1926.01.28 as Apostolic Prefecture of Coquilhatville / de Coquilhatville (Latin), having gained territory from the same Apostolic Vicariate of Nouvelle-Anvers); it became the Roman Catholic Archdiocese of Mbandaka-Bikoro.

Administrative areas 
Territorial components are :
 Befale
 Boende
 Bokungu
 Djolu
 Ikela
 Monkoto

Notable residents

 Guy Loando Mboyo
 Ambroise Boimbo
 Justin Marie Bomboko

See also 
 Tsuapa Red Colobus (Primate Species)

References 

 
Provinces of the Democratic Republic of the Congo